Hannes Winklbauer (born 25 December 1949) is an Austrian retired footballer and coach.

References

External links
 Sturm Archiv

1949 births
Living people
Austrian footballers
Austrian football managers
Kapfenberger SV players
SW Bregenz players
FC Red Bull Salzburg players
FC Red Bull Salzburg managers
Association football defenders
Austria international footballers